Boggio is a surname. Notable people with the name include:

Bautista Salvador Etcheverry Boggio (1931–2015), Uruguayan Ambassador
Emilio Boggio (1857–1920), Italian-Venezuelan pioneering impressionist painter
Jim Boggio (1939–1996), American accordionist
Norberto Boggio (1931–2021), Argentine football forward
Tommaso Boggio (1877–1963), Italian mathematician

See also 
Boggio's formula, mathematical field of potential theory